Karimabad (also Romanized as Karīmābād) is a village in Hashivar Rural District, in the Central District of Darab County, Fars Province, Iran. At the 2006 census, its population was 457, in 96 families.

References 

Populated places in Darab County